La Perouse or Lapérouse may refer to:

Places
La Pérouse, French exonym for Perugia in Italy
La Perouse, New South Wales, a suburb of Sydney
La Perouse (New Zealand), a mountain in the Southern Alps of New Zealand
La Pérouse Strait, a strait between the Russia island of Sakhalin and the Japanese island of Hokkaido
La Perouse Bay, a bay on Maui, Hawaii
La Perouse Bay, a bay on Easter Island (Rapa Nui) in Chile
La Pérouse, old name of city of Tamentfoust, Algiers
Lycée Français de San Francisco, previously Lycée Français La Pérouse, a total immersion French language school based in San Francisco, California

People
 Jean-François de Galaup, comte de Lapérouse, a French naval officer and explorer

Ships

Named for the comte de Lapérouse:

 French navy
The Lapérouse class are Hydrographic survey ships.
Lapérouse (A791) is a current serving ship of the Hydrographic and Oceanographic Service, launched at Brest in 1988
Lapérouse, a cruiser launched at Brest in 1877
CMA CGM Lapérouse, a cargo ship

Other
Lapérouse (restaurant), restaurant in Paris